Toru Koga  is a Japanese mixed martial artist.

Mixed martial arts record

|-
| Loss
| align=center| 0-3
| Yasushi Warita
| KO (head kick)
| Shooto: Vale Tudo Junction 3
| 
| align=center| 3
| align=center| 0:18
| Tokyo, Japan
| 
|-
| Loss
| align=center| 0-2
| Kazuhiro Kusayanagi
| Submission (armbar)
| Shooto: Vale Tudo Junction 2
| 
| align=center| 4
| align=center| 2:14
| Tokyo, Japan
| 
|-
| Loss
| align=center| 0-1
| Kyuhei Ueno
| TKO (punches)
| Shooto: Tokyo Free Fight
| 
| align=center| 3
| align=center| 1:43
| Tokyo, Japan
|

See also
List of male mixed martial artists

References

External links
 
 Toru Koga at mixedmartialarts.com

Japanese male mixed martial artists
Living people
Year of birth missing (living people)